Adelina Abranches  (15 August 1866 – 21 November 1945) was a Portuguese stage actress born in Lisbon. She was considered a child prodigy, performing roles on stage at the age of four. She is notable for her acting career in Rio de Janeiro.

Overview
She was born in Lisbon, Portugal. A theatrical child prodigy, she first performed at just four years of age in the piece Meninos Grandes ("Big Kids") at the National Theatre D. Maria II in Lisbon. She became known as "the Spanish girl" because of the dress she wore in her first role. She then began a brilliant career in Rio de Janeiro, playing, in spite of her small stature, drag roles, soubrettes, and ladies of the night.  She made an impact in plays such as Os Velhos ("The Old Ones"), Avô ("Grandfather"), Pranto de Maria Parda ("Maria Parda's Tears"), and The Lady of the Camellias in which she had widespread success.

Silent films
In 1930 she played Aunt Aurélia in the Portuguese silent film, Maria do Mar, directed by José Leitão de Barros. In Portugal she worked under Amélia Rey Colaço alongside actors such as Eunice Muñoz and Estêvão Amarante.

Family
She married Luís Ruas, owner of the Teatro do Príncipe Real, and was the mother of actors Luís Ruas and Aura Abranches; the latter published her mother's memoirs in 1947.

Distinctions

National orders
 Officer of the Order of Saint James of the Sword (5 October 1928)

References 

 Grande História Universal Ediclube, 2006
 Grande Enciclopédia Portuguesa e Brasileira
 Nova Enciclopédia Portuguesa, Ed. Publicações Ediclube, 1996

External links 
 

1866 births
1945 deaths
19th-century Portuguese actresses
20th-century Portuguese actresses
Officers of the Order of Saint James of the Sword
Portuguese stage actresses
Actresses from Lisbon